Pseudotephritis is a genus of picture-winged flies in the family Ulidiidae.

Species
Pseudotephritis approximata Banks, 1914
Pseudotephritis corticalis (Loew, 1873)
Pseudotephritis millepunctata (Hennig, 1939)
Pseudotephritis ussurica Krivosheina & Krivosheina, 1997
Pseudotephritis vau (Say, 1830)

References

Ulidiidae
Diptera of North America
Diptera of Asia
Diptera of Europe
Brachycera genera
Taxa named by Charles Willison Johnson